Roop Durgapal is an Indian television actress. She is  best known for her role as Sanchi in the serial Balika Vadhu.

Early life and career 
Roop Durgapal was born in Almora, Uttarakhand, India. She earned a Bachelor of Technology degree in Instrumentation and Control Engineering at Graphic Era Deemed To Be University in 2006, and worked at Infosys before starting her career in acting.

Durgapal played Sanchi in the serial Balika Vadhu from 2012 to 2015. She has played characters in Babosa Mere Bhagwan,  Shama, and played Dari Dari Pari in the children's show Baal Veer.

In March 2015, she made a guest appearance as an ichchhadhari naagin, a mythical shapeshifting snake, in Akbar Birbal. She has also appeared in television advertisements.

In February 2016, she played the role of Kavya Maheshwari in Swaragini on Colors, and in April 2016 she played Natasha Gujral in Kuch Rang Pyar Ke Aise Bhi on Sony TV.

In June 2016, once again she made a guest appearance in Big Magic's Akbar Birbal as Birbal, playing a man's role for the first time. It was announced in August 2016 that the actress would be joining the serial Gangaa in the role of Supriya.

In October 2018, Durgapal played the lead role of a lawyer, Sharmishtha, in Zing TV's love stories based episodic show Pyaar Pehli Baar, which was a revamp of "Pyaar Tune Kya Kiya (TV series)".

Durgapal has joined Zee Tv's series  
Tujhse Hai Raabta, playing a Maharshtrian girl, Ketki, for the first time in July, 2019.

In September 2019, it was announced that she will be joining the team of CIF, on Dangal TV as the new Forensic Doctor, Sakshi Shrivastava. In October 2019, she became a part of the romantic horror show Laal Ishq  on &tv.

In February 2020, Roop played the protagonist Sonia in another supernatural story "Patal Danav" of 
Laal Ishq  on &tv. In March 2020, for the third time, Roop played the protagonist Aleesha in supernatural story "Mayavi Shakhi" of 
Laal Ishq  on &tv.

Durgapal was nominated as "Most Tez Taraar Personality" in the 2013 Colors Golden Petal Awards.

Television 
 2012 CID as Sunita (Episode 794)
 2012–2013 Baal Veer as Dari Pari
 2012–2015 Balika Vadhu as Sanchi Kabra (née Shekhar)
 2015 Akbar Birbal as Ichhadhari Nagin
 2016 Swaragini - Jodein Rishton Ke Sur as Kavya Maheshwari (née Malhotra)
 2016 Kuch Rang Pyar Ke Aise Bhi as Natasha Gujral
 2016 Akbar Birbal as Birbal
 2016-2017 Gangaa as Supriya Chaturvedi
 2017 Waaris as Sakshi
 2018 Pyaar Pehli Baar as Sharmishtha
 2019 Tujhse Hai Raabta as Ketki Walia (Episode 247-Episode 256; Episode 260-Episode 271)
 2019 CIF as Dr. Sakshi Srivastav (Episode 08)
 November 2019   Laal Ishq as Kajal
 February 2020   Laal Ishq as Sonia
 March 2020   Laal Ishq as Aleesha
 2021 Kuch Rang Pyar Ke Aise Bhi as Natasha Gujral

See also 
 List of Indian television actresses

References

External links

 
 

Living people
Year of birth missing (living people)
Place of birth missing (living people)
21st-century Indian actresses
Indian television actresses
People from Almora
Actresses from Uttar Pradesh